Frederick Clinton Quimby (July 31, 1886 – September 16, 1965) was an American animation producer and journalist best known for producing the Tom and Jerry cartoon series, for which he won seven Academy Awards for Best Animated Short Films. He was the film sales executive in charge of the Metro-Goldwyn-Mayer cartoon studio, which included Tex Avery, Droopy, Butch Dog, Barney Bear, Michael Lah and multiple one-shot cartoons, as well as William Hanna and Joseph Barbera, the creators of Tom and Jerry.

Life and career
Quimby was born in Minneapolis, Minnesota, and started his career as a journalist. In 1907, he managed a film theater in Missoula, Montana. Later, he worked at Pathé, and became a member of the board of directors before leaving in 1921 to become an independent producer. He was hired by Fox Film in 1924, and moved to MGM in 1927 to head its short features department. In 1937, he was assigned to create MGM's animation department.

In 1939, William Hanna and Joseph Barbera presented Quimby with a proposal for a series of cartoons featuring a cat and a mouse. Although he had no interest in the idea, Quimby approved, and the result was Puss Gets the Boot, which was nominated for an Academy Award. Initially, he refused to pursue more Cat and Mouse cartoons after Puss Gets the Boot. However, following the critical and financial success of that cartoon, he agreed to make Tom and Jerry an official cartoon of the MGM cartoon studio. As producer, Quimby became a multiple recipient of the Academy Award for Animated Short Film for the Tom and Jerry films, though he never invited Hanna and Barbera onstage when he accepted the awards. His name became well known due to its prominence in the cartoon credits, and Quimby took sole credit for approving and producing the Tom and Jerry series. Quimby was not involved in the creative process and had a difficult relationship with animators, including Hanna and Barbera, who believed that Quimby was not fit for a real animation leader:

After the production of Good Will to Men (a remake of Peace on Earth), Quimby retired from MGM in May 1955, with Hanna and Barbera assuming his role as co-heads of the studio and taking over the production title for the Tom and Jerry shorts. Despite the success with Hanna and Barbera, MGM assumed that re-releasing old cartoons would be more profitable, and the MGM's cartoon division did not last long after; it was closed in 1957. MGM would later contract first Gene Deitch and then Chuck Jones to produce more Tom and Jerry shorts through their own studios during the 1960s.

Quimby died of a heart attack in Santa Monica, California on September 16, 1965, about seven weeks after his 79th birthday, and was buried at Forest Lawn Memorial Park in Glendale, California.

Academy Award credits
 Nominated for Best Animated Short Subject 1940: Puss Gets the Boot – producer (with Rudolf Ising) 
 Winner Best Animated Short Subject 1940: The Milky Way – producer (with Rudolf Ising)
 Nominated for Best Animated Short Subject 1941: The Night Before Christmas – producer
 Nominated for Best Animated Short Subject 1941: The Rookie Bear – producer
 Nominated for Best Animated Short Subject 1942: The Blitz Wolf – producer
 Winner Best Animated Short Subject 1943: The Yankee Doodle Mouse – producer
 Winner Best Animated Short Subject 1944: Mouse Trouble – producer
 Winner Best Animated Short Subject 1945: Quiet Please! – producer
 Winner Best Animated Short Subject 1946: The Cat Concerto – producer
 Nominated for Best Animated Short Subject 1947: Dr. Jekyll and Mr. Mouse – producer
 Winner Best Animated Short Subject 1948: The Little Orphan – producer
 Nominated for Best Animated Short Subject 1949: Hatch Up Your Troubles – producer
 Nominated for Best Animated Short Subject 1950: Jerry's Cousin – producer
 Winner Best Animated Short Subject 1951: The Two Mouseketeers – producer
 Winner Best Animated Short Subject 1952: Johann Mouse – producer 
 Nominated for Best Animated Short Subject 1952: Little Johnny Jet – producer
 Nominated for Best Animated Short Subject 1954: Touché, Pussy Cat! – producer
 Nominated for Best Animated Short Subject 1955: Good Will to Men – producer (with William Hanna & Joseph Barbera)

References

External links

 
 The Tom and Jerry Story
 The Creators – The Magic Behind The Cartoon

1886 births
1965 deaths
20th-century American businesspeople
American animated film producers
Businesspeople from Minneapolis
Burials at Forest Lawn Memorial Park (Glendale)
Film producers from Minnesota
Journalists from Minnesota
Metro-Goldwyn-Mayer cartoon studio people
Producers who won the Best Animated Short Academy Award